Cypress Woods High School, commonly known as Cy Woods, is a secondary school located in Cypress, which is an unincorporated area of Harris County, Texas, United States, near Houston.

The principal of Cypress Woods is Gary Kinninger. The school mascot is the Wildcat.

History 
Cypress Woods, announced in 2005 as Cypress-Fairbanks Independent School District High School #8, is part of the Cypress-Fairbanks Independent School District. The school opened in the fall of 2006 due to rapid growth of CFISD. The  campus was built at a cost of 50.9 million United States dollars  by Pepper-Lawson Incorporated on a  site. The campus was designed by PBK.  CWHS relieved Cy-Fair High School and Cypress Falls High School.

The first graduating class was the Class of 2009. About 140 staff members (including 100 teachers) served about 2,100 students when Cypress Woods opened.

The first group of students joined the administration in selecting the school's mascot, Wildcats, prior to the school's opening.  The board of trustees approved crimson red and gold as the school's colors.

Campus 
The school shares a campus with Robison Elementary School and Spillane Middle School; this campus takes up  of space. The Carlton Banks Center (colloquially the Carlton Center) is connected to the high school building and provides pre-vocational programs for students with disabilities.
The school participates in a variety of varsity level sports at the 6A level and club level. The 6A sports include: baseball; basketball; cross country; football; golf; soccer; softball; tennis; swimming and diving; track and field; volleyball; wrestling; and water polo. The club sports include: bowling; fishing; ice hockey; and lacrosse.

Academics
For the 201819 school year, the school received an A grade from the Texas Education Agency, with an overall score of 94 out of 100. The school received an A grade in each of the three performance domains, with a score of 95 for Student Achievement, 91 for School Progress, and 92 for Closing the Gaps. The school received five of the seven possible distinction designations for Academic Achievement in Mathematics, Academic Achievement in Social Studies, Top 25%: Comparative Academic Growth, Post-Secondary Readiness, and Top 25%: Comparative Closing the Gaps. The school did not receive distinction designations for Academic Achievement in Science or Academic Achievement in English Language Arts/Reading. In 2019, the school was the overall champion of the UIL state academic meet, with 105.5 points in total.

Demographics
The demographic breakdown of the 3,320 students enrolled for 201920 was:

African American: 10.6%
Hispanic: 30.0%
White: 49.4%
American Indian: 0.4%
Asian: 10.9%
Pacific Islander: 0.1%
Two or More Races: 2.7%

21.6% of the students were eligible for free or reduced-cost lunch.

Feeder patterns 
Schools that feed into Cypress Woods include:
Elementary schools: Farney, Robison, Sampson, Black (partial), Keith (partial),
Middle schools: Goodson, Spillane

Notable alumni 
Cammile Adams (2010), Olympic athlete
Bryce Callahan (2010), cornerback for the Denver Broncos
Jared Lakind (2010), American-Israeli professional baseball pitcher
Chase McLaughlin (2014), placekicker for the Cleveland Browns
Erica Ogwumike (2015), former college basketball player for the Rice Owls
Munzer Kabbara (2021), Olympic swimmer

References

External links 
 

Cypress-Fairbanks Independent School District high schools
2006 establishments in Texas
Educational institutions established in 2006